A Star is Shining, Yolandita Monge Vol. 2 is the second (2nd) studio album by Puerto Rican singer Yolandita Monge and contains the radio hit "Amor En El Aire". It was released in 1970 and it is currently out of print in all media formats.

Track listing

Notes
Vocals: Yolandita Monge
Track listing and credits from album cover.

References

Yolandita Monge albums
1970 albums
Spanish-language albums